This is a list of broadcasters for the Colorado Avalanche ice hockey team.

Current broadcasters

 Marc Moser – TV play-by-play
 Mark Rycroft – TV color commentator
 John-Michael Liles – TV studio analyst
 Kyle Keefe – TV studio host (rotating)
 Conor McGahey – Radio play-by-play/analyst
 Mark Bertagnolli – Radio studio host
 Alan Roach – Public address
 Lauren Jbara - TV Studio

Radio

Television 
Avalanche games have aired on regional sports network Altitude Sports and Entertainment since 2004, replacing FSN Rocky Mountain.

Notes
On April 7, 2008, Haynes was diagnosed with a brain aneurysm of his basilar artery. He successfully underwent surgery for the problem two days later but was unable to do the play-by-play for the Colorado Avalanche in the 2008 Stanley Cup playoffs. Former Avalanche and current St. Louis Blues announcer John Kelly filled in during Haynes's absence.
On June 8, 2009, McNab signed a multi-year deal with Altitude, where he started his 14th season as color commentator for the Colorado Avalanche at the beginning of the 2009-2010 NHL season.

References

External links
Broadcast Personalities | Colorado Avalanche - NHL.com
On-Air Talent - Altitude Sports

 
broadcasters
Lists of National Hockey League broadcasters
Fox Sports Networks
Kroenke Sports & Entertainment